This is a list of episodes for The Colbert Report in 2012.

2012

January

February 
Taping of February 15 and 16 were cancelled due to illness of Colbert's Mother.

March

April

May

June

July

August

September

October 
Taping of October 29 and 30 were cancelled due to Hurricane Sandy.

November

December

References

External links

 
 

2012
2012 American television seasons
2012 in American television